The 2012 FSP Gold River Women's Challenger was a professional tennis tournament played on hard courts. It was the first edition of the tournament which was part of the 2012 ITF Women's Circuit. It took place in Sacramento, California, United States between 28 May and 3 June 2012.

WTA entrants

Seeds

 1 Rankings are as of May 21, 2012.

Other entrants
The following players received wildcards into the singles main draw:
  Gabrielle Andrews
  Elizabeth Lumpkin
  Breanna Alexa Bachini

The following players received entry from the qualifying draw:
  Mary Closs
  Tatsiana Kapshay
  Tori Kinard
  Elizabeth Profit

Champions

Singles

 Maria Sanchez def.  Jessica Pegula, 4–6, 6–3, 6–1

Doubles

 Asia Muhammad /  Yasmin Schnack def.  Kaitlyn Christian /  Maria Sanchez, 6–3, 7–6(7–4)

External links
ITF Search
Official Website

FSP Gold River Women's Challenger
FSP
2012 in sports in California
2012 in American tennis